Bullets & Lipstik is an EP by the band Pretty Boy Floyd was released on the independent record label Hanover Records in 1988. There is also a Bullets & Lipstik LP that was release in 1989 with 4 additional songs..

There is a video for the song "Welcome To The Show".

Track listing
 Welcome To The Show
 Four For The Road
 Somewhere Over That Rainbow
 Proud To Be Loud
 Raggedy Ann
 Bullets & Lipstik

Credits
 Tommy Floyd: lead vocals
 Pete Parker: guitar
 Steve Bratz: bass guitar
 Sandy Hazard: drums

References

https://heavyharmonies.com/cgi-bin/glamcd.cgi?BandNum=529&CDName=Bullets+and+Lipstik

https://www.metalreviews.com/reviews/album/1313

https://melodic-hardrock.com/pretty-boy-floyd-bullets-and-lipstik-1989/

1989 EPs
Pretty Boy Floyd (Canadian band) albums